Malmö Art Academy is an art school as part of Lund University in Lund, Sweden.

External links
 http://www.khm.lu.se/en/ (English)

Art schools in Sweden
Malmö